CSC – IT Center for Science Ltd.  (also known as Finnish IT center for science) provides IT support and modeling, computing and information services for academia, research institutes and companies in Finland. It is owned by the Finnish state and Finnish higher education institutions, administered by the Ministry of Education and Culture, and operated on a non-profit principle. CSC has provided computational and network services since 1971.

The CSC servers create a common user environment. The service environment is made up of several supercomputers, database servers and information servers that are all linked together with a fast data transfer connection into one metacomputer. Extensive data and archive servers are available for saving results.

CSC also manages the FUNET network, which is the Finnish national research and education network that provides fast internet access to universities and other academic institutions as well as some governmental agencies.

External links
CSC's homepage

Information technology organisations based in Finland
Government-owned companies of Finland